Thunder Mountain in the Sierra Nevada of California is located east of Silver Lake and west of Kirkwood Mountain Resort in the Eldorado National Forest. The mountain has two peaks, the  main peak and a  sub-peak west of the main peak. The main summit is the highest point in Amador County. Due to the high elevation, most precipitation that falls on Thunder Mountain consists of snow.

The peak was named by United States Forest Service personnel because "thunderstorms appear to build up in that area."

Climate
According to the Köppen climate classification system, Thunder Mountain is located in an alpine climate zone. Most weather fronts originate in the Pacific Ocean and travel east toward the Sierra Nevada mountains. As fronts approach, they are forced upward by the peaks (orographic lift), causing them to drop their moisture in the form of rain or snowfall onto the range.

References

External links
 

Mountains of Amador County, California
Mountains of the Sierra Nevada (United States)
Mountains of Northern California
North American 2000 m summits